Hollywood Preview was a 30-minute show aired on the DuMont Television Network from September 14, 1955, to June 1, 1956. The show, hosted by actor Conrad Nagel, featured Hollywood stars and clips of upcoming films.

Broadcast history
The show had various time slots during its broadcast run. The show began as a weekly show (September 1955 to March 1956), then went to weekdays Monday through Friday for the final months (April to June 1956).
Wednesday 9-9:30pm (14 September 1955 – 28 December 1955)
Friday 10:30-11pm (6 January 1956 – 30 March 1956)
Monday to Friday 4:30-5pm (2 April 1956 – 1 June 1956)

Preservation status
As with most DuMont series, no episodes are known to exist.

See also
 List of programs broadcast by the DuMont Television Network
 List of surviving DuMont Television Network broadcasts
 1955-56 United States network television schedule

References

Bibliography
 David Weinstein, The Forgotten Network: DuMont and the Birth of American Television (Philadelphia: Temple University Press, 2004) 
 Alex McNeil, Total Television, Fourth edition (New York: Penguin Books, 1980) 
 Tim Brooks and Earle Marsh, The Complete Directory to Prime Time Network TV Shows, Third edition (New York: Ballantine Books, 1964)

External links

DuMont historical website 
Hollywood Preview at CVTA with list of episodes

1955 American television series debuts
1956 American television series endings
1950s American television series
Black-and-white American television shows
DuMont Television Network original programming